D.J. Demers (born 1986) is a Canadian stand-up comedian, best known for his television appearances on season 11 of America's Got Talent and on the late night talk show Conan. Originally from Kitchener, Ontario, Demers was diagnosed with hearing loss in childhood, and focuses his comedy largely but not exclusively on his experiences as a person who wears hearing aids.

Career
Demers began performing comedy in his second year of university, making his first comedy club appearance at Yuk Yuk's. He won the 2013 Toronto Comedy Brawl and the Homegrown Comics Competition at the Just for Laughs Festival in 2014, and won a Canadian Comedy Award for Best Breakout Artist in 2015.

He appeared on America's Got Talent in 2016, advancing to the Judge Cuts round but not making it to the live shows. In 2017 he appeared on Conan, and undertook a comedy tour of university and college campuses across the United States sponsored by hearing aid manufacturer Phonak. He has also appeared on episodes of the CBC Radio comedy series The Debaters.

He received a Juno Award nomination for Comedy Album of the Year at the Juno Awards of 2018, for his comedy album [Indistinct Chatter].

In 2019 his stand-up comedy special Interpreted was released as a Crave original, and he headlined Comedy for a Cause, a stand-up show in Montreal that consisted entirely of comedians with physical disabilities. His second comedy album Uninterpreted, a selection of segments from the Crave special, was also released the same year.

References

External links

Canadian stand-up comedians
Comedians from Ontario
People from Kitchener, Ontario
Living people
Canadian deaf people
21st-century Canadian comedians
America's Got Talent contestants
Canadian male comedians
Canadian Comedy Award winners
1986 births